Belpre is a city in Edwards County, Kansas, United States.  As of the 2020 census, the population of the city was 97.

History
Belpre was founded in 1879. It was incorporated in 1906. Belpre is derived from the French word "belle prairie" for "beautiful meadow".

The first post office in Belpre was established in 1879.

Geography
Belpre is located at  (37.950976, -99.099597).

Climate
The climate in this area is characterized by hot, humid summers and generally mild to cool winters.  According to the Köppen Climate Classification system, Belpre has a humid subtropical climate, abbreviated "Cfa" on climate maps.

Demographics

2010 census
As of the census of 2010, there were 84 people, 34 households, and 18 families residing in the city. The racial makeup of the city was 88.1% White, 1.2% Native American, and 10.7% from other races. Hispanic or Latino of any race were 45.2% of the population.

There were 34 households, of which 29.4% had children under the age of 18 living with them, 38.2% were married couples living together, 8.8% had a female householder with no husband present, 5.9% had a male householder with no wife present, and 47.1% were non-families. 38.2% of all households were made up of individuals, and 23.5% had someone living alone who was 65 years of age or older. The average household size was 2.47 and the average family size was 3.44.

The median age in the city was 39 years. 28.6% of residents were under the age of 18; 8.3% were between the ages of 18 and 24; 19.1% were from 25 to 44; 29.8% were from 45 to 64; and 14.3% were 65 years of age or older. The gender makeup of the city was 48.8% male and 51.2% female.

2000 census
As of the census of 2000, there were 104 people, 45 households, and 28 families residing in the city. The racial makeup of the city was 97.12% White, 1.92% African American, 0.96% from other races. Hispanic or Latino of any race were 4.81% of the population.

There were 45 households, out of which 24.4% had children under the age of 18 living with them, 48.9% were married couples living together, 11.1% had a female householder with no husband present, and 35.6% were non-families. 35.6% of all households were made up of individuals, and 17.8% had someone living alone who was 65 years of age or older. The average household size was 2.31 and the average family size was 3.00.

In the city, the population was spread out, with 26.9% under the age of 18, 7.7% from 18 to 24, 25.0% from 25 to 44, 22.1% from 45 to 64, and 18.3% who were 65 years of age or older. The median age was 38 years. For every 100 females, there were 92.6 males. For every 100 females age 18 and over, there were 76.7 males.

The median income for a household in the city was $23,750, and the median income for a family was $31,563. Males had a median income of $25,000 versus $16,875 for females. The per capita income for the city was $14,665. There were 8.7% of families and 8.0% of the population living below the poverty line, including no under eighteens and none of those over 64.

References

External links

 Belpre - Directory of Public Officials
 USD 351, local school district
 Belpre city map, EdwardsCounty.org
 Belpre city map, KDOT

Cities in Kansas
Cities in Edwards County, Kansas
1879 establishments in Kansas
Populated places established in 1879